Lakterashan (also Romanized as Lākterāshān and Lāk Tarāshān) is a village in Goli Jan Rural District, in the Central District of Tonekabon County, Mazandaran Province, Iran. At the 2006 census, its population was 167, in 44 families.

References 

Populated places in Tonekabon County